Washita is a rural community in Caddo County, Oklahoma, United States. It is located west of Anadarko on a bend in the Washita River. The post office opened April 16, 1910.

A municipal electrical power generation plant for Anadarko is located in Washita.

It is zoned to Anadarko Public Schools.

Demographics

References

Unincorporated communities in Caddo County, Oklahoma
Unincorporated communities in Oklahoma